is a 2017 Japanese animated film produced by Production I.G and distributed by Shochiku. This is the first film in the Kuroko's Basketball franchise, created by Tadatoshi Fujimaki. It was released in Japanese cinemas on March 18, 2017. ODEX later screened the film in Singapore and Malaysia on May 4, 2017, Philippines on May 17, 2017, Indonesia on May 17, 2017, and Vietnam on July 18, 2017. The film began streaming on Netflix on November 15, 2021 with an English dub.

Synopsis
The U.S. street basketball team named  came to Japan and played a friendly match with the Japanese team, but after the Japanese team suffered a crushing defeat, Jabberwock team members began to mock the Japanese basketball. Their comments infuriated Riko's father, so he assembled a team of five Generation of Miracles members plus Tetsuya Kuroko and Taiga Kagami, called , to perform a  against Jabberwock.

Voice cast

Vorpal Swords

Jabberwock 

Captain of the American basketball team Jabberwock. Gold has a two-faced personality. Outside the court he was calm, polite and even charming. But as a player in court he is cruel, rude and perhaps the most arrogant in the team. In addition, he seems to have a darker personality when he becomes serious. This can be seen when he revealed his "Belial Eye" to Akashi. Gold becomes even more arrogant, saying that even God can not defeat it.

One of the members of the American basketball team Jabberwock. Silver is arrogant and ignorant, and he calls himself the "Almighty Me." Along with that he is also very talkative, just to have a lot of interest in women. He will not care about the people around him, unless it's Gold Jr. will be the one who did it. Silver also tends to mock those whom he considers weak.

Production
The ending theme song of this movie is "Glorious days" sung by GRANRODEO.

Reception

Box office
The film opened in Japan on March 18 on 91 screens. The film was ranked 6th in attendance on average per screen in its opening weekend having been defeated by Pretty Cure Dream Stars! by Izumi Todo who debuted the same week and beat Sword Art Online The Movie: Ordinal Scale by Reki Kawahara and Your Name by Makoto Shinkai.

Controversy
On May 17, 2017, GSC Movies posted that the parts of the film were supposedly recorded during the Malaysian screening time, and posted online. GSC Movies later wrote the apology statement that it was "greatly threatening" to ODEX, GSC Movies and Japanese film copyright holders.

References

External links
  
 
 

2017 anime films
Medialink
Production I.G
Anime films based on manga
Anime and manga controversies
Basketball in anime and manga
Film controversies in Malaysia
2010s Japanese-language films
Japanese animated films
Kuroko's Basketball
Basketball films